The 2005–06 Czech 1.liga season was the 13th season of the Czech 1.liga, the second level of ice hockey in the Czech Republic. 14 teams participated in the league, and HC Slovan Usti nad Labem won the championship.

Regular season

Playoffs

Quarterfinals 
 HC Slovan Ústí nad Labem – HC Olomouc 4:0 (4:1, 8:2, 3:1, 3:1)
 HC Dukla Jihlava – HC Hradec Králové 2:4 (5:4 SN, 2:4, 3:2, 2:3, 4:5 P, 0:4)
 BK Mladá Boleslav – KLH Chomutov 4:0 (3:0, 1:0, 3:2 SN, 2:1)
 HC Kometa Brno – HC Havířov 1:4 (4:3, 1:3, 2:3, 0:3, 0:1)

Semifinals 
 HC Slovan Ústí nad Labem – HC Hradec Králové 3:0 (4:1, 1:0, 4:1)
 BK Mladá Boleslav – HC Havířov 3:0 (3:1, 7:3, 2:1)

Final 
 HC Slovan Ústí nad Labem – BK Mladá Boleslav 3:1 (0:6, 3:1, 2:0, 4:2)

Relegation

External links
 Season on hockeyarchives.info

2005–06 in Czech ice hockey
Czech
Czech 1. Liga seasons